Androsov is a surname. Notable people with the surname include:

Gennady Androsov (1939–2016), Ukrainian swimmer
Kirill Androsov (born 1972), Russian businessman
Sergei Androsov (born 1986), Russian footballer
Valery Androsov (born 1939), Russian painter and architect

Russian-language surnames